This list of botanical gardens and arboretums in Alabama is intended to include all significant botanical gardens and arboretums in the U.S. state of Alabama.

See also
Alabama Champion Tree Program
List of botanical gardens and arboretums in the United States

References

Tourist attractions in Alabama
 
Arboreta in Alabama
botanical gardens and arboretums in Alabama